Pretty, Baby, Machine (also known as Pretty Baby Machine) is a three-issue comic book limited series written by Clark Westerman with art by Kody Chamberlain, and released by Image Comics through their ShadowLine studio in 2008.

The title refers to the three protagonists: Pretty Boy Floyd, Baby Face Nelson, and Machine Gun Kelly.

Plot
In 1933, three famous outlaws come together to fight Al Capone.

Adaptation
Landscape Entertainment has acquired the rights to produce a film version. No further progress was made on the project and is presumably canceled.

Notes

References

Shadowline titles
2008 comics debuts
2008 comics endings
Cultural depictions of Al Capone
Cultural depictions of Machine Gun Kelly
Cultural depictions of Pretty Boy Floyd
Cultural depictions of Baby Face Nelson
Crime comics
Comics based on real people
Comics set in the 1930s
Comics set in the United States